Dauphine is the female form of the particular French feudal (comital or princely) title of Dauphin (also Anglicized as Dolphin), applied to the wife of a Dauphin (usually in the sense of heir to the French royal throne).
 Dauphine of France
 Dauphin de Viennois
 Dauphine of Auvergne

Dauphine may also refer to:

Places 
 Dauphiné, a province in southeastern France
 Dauphine Street, a street in the French Quarter of New Orleans, Louisiana, United States
 Dauphine Orleans Hotel, a hotel on Dauphine Street
 Dauphine River, a river in the L'Île-d'Orléans Regional County Municipality, Capitale-Nationale, Quebec, Canada
 Paris Dauphine University, a university near Porte Dauphine in Paris

Other uses 
 Berliet Dauphine 11CV, a model of automobile 1934-1939
 Pommes dauphine, a recipe for fried potato
 Renault Dauphine, a model of automobile 1956-1967
 Critérium du Dauphiné, a cycle race that before 2010 was known as the Critérium du Dauphiné Libéré
 a common fig cultivar

See also 
 Dauphin (disambiguation)
 Dauphinois (disambiguation)